The 2006 Women's Rugby World Cup (officially IRB Rugby World Cup 2006 Canada) took place in Edmonton, Alberta, Canada. The tournament began on 31 August and ended on 17 September 2006. The 2006 tournament was the third World Cup approved by the IRB, the previous two being held 2002 in Spain and in the Netherlands, in 1998. The Black Ferns of New Zealand won the 2006 World Cup, defeating England in the final, as they had in 2002. It was New Zealand's third successive title.

The semi-finals were also direct repeats of the 2002 tournament – in fact five of the top six places in the final rankings were unchanged. Elsewhere the USA advanced from 7th in 2002 to 5th, and Ireland climbed from 14th to 8th while Australia (5th to 7th), Spain (8th to 9th), and Samoa (9th to 10th) slipped down.

The period prior to the competition had not been without controversy. The decision to award the hosting of the competition to Canada ahead of a strong bid from England surprised many.

In addition – apart from in Asia – there were no qualifying tournaments for the 2006 World Cup. Instead teams were invited to take part by the IRB with selection based on performances at the World Cup in 2002 and in international matches between 2002 and 2005. This resulted in accusations of a lack of clarity in regard to some selection decisions. In particular the awarding of the final place in the tournament to Samoa instead of Wales (following a poor performance by Wales in the 2005 Six Nations) was the cause of some controversy and comment prior to the event.

Qualifiers

Asia

Tickets and sponsorship 
Tickets had been available since July 2006 and they could be purchased online at Ticketmaster or by phone. There were individual and student tickets (for each of six match days), tickets for youth teams and clubs, corporate packages and a special "World Cup Pack" of $125 allowing access to all matches including the finals.The partners of this tournament were Toyota "Never Quit" Awards Program, Molson, Tait Radio Communications, Glentel, Budget, University of Alberta, Edmonton Airports and Clubfit.
The event was covered by English language network Global TV, daily newspaper Edmonton Journal and radio stations CFRN 1260, CFBR 100.3 and CFMG 104.9.All matches were filmed and for the first time were available via streamed media. The final was also broadcast live on TV in a number of countries, including the United Kingdom, and a one-hour TV highlights programme was produced by IMG for wider distribution, while these recordings are held as part of the IRB's World Cup archive.

Match officials 
On July 6, 2006 the IRB Referee Selection Committee announced the appointment of match officials, with twelve women officials selected for the tournament consisting of eight referees and four touch judges. This panel was assisted by experienced international referees George Ayoub, Lyndon Bray, Malcolm Changleng and Simon McDowell, who were appointed in April. Other three touch judges from Canada Rugby Union were included in the final list.

REFEREES
 George Ayoub (Australia)
 Jenny Bental (South Africa)
 Rachel Boyland (Switzerland)
 Lyndon Bray (New Zealand)
 Malcolm Changleng (Scotland)
 Sarah Corrigan (Australia)
 Clare Daniels (England)
 Christine Hanizet (France)
 Joyce Henry (Canada)
 Nicky Inwood (New Zealand)
 Kerstin Ljungdahl (Germany)
 Simon McDowell (Ireland)

TOUCH JUDGES
 Debbie Innes (England)
 Kristina Mellor (New Zealand)
 Kristi Moorman (Canada)
 Sandy Nesbitt (Canada)
 Kim Smit (South Africa)
 Dana Teagarden (United States)
 Todd Van Vliet (Canada)

Format 
The competition was contested over 18 days between 12 teams, allocated to four pools of three and structured into two parts:
 a pool stage, with 18 matches played from August 31 to September 8;
 a knockout stage, divided in semifinals and finals, played from September 12 to 17.

Pool stage 
The first three match days saw a cross-pool league system in operation, with Pool A playing Pool D and Pool B playing Pool C, with points going towards one single division table for all four pools.
Classification within each pool was based on the following scoring system:
 four points for a win;
 two points for a draw;
 zero points for a loss of 8 points or more.
Bonus points were awarded for teams scoring 4 tries or more and losing by 7 points or less. No extra time were played.
Teams were ranked 1–12 on the basis of the most match points. If two teams were equal on match points for any position, then the following criteria would be used in this order until one of the teams could be determined as the higher ranked:
 the winner of the match between the two teams;
 the best differential between points scored for and points scored against;
 the best differential between tries scored for and against;
 the most points scored;
 the most tries scored;
 the toss of a coin.

Knockout stage 
After three match days, with each team having played three pool matches, positional semifinals were played with the top four-positioned sides vying to make the Women's Rugby World Cup final and all other sides playing matches in the final two rounds to decide tournament rankings.

If no winner could be determined within the time allowed, two teams should have played an extra time of 10 minutes each way with an interval of 5 and then eventually a kicking competition.

Squads

Pools

Pool A

Pool B

Pool C

Pool D

Pool matches

Round one

Round two

Round three

Knock-out stages

9th-12th place classification play-offs

Semi-finals

11th/12th place play-off

9th/10th place play-off

5th-8th classification play-offs

Semi-finals

7th/8th place play-off

5th/6th place play-off

Finals

Semi-finals

3rd/4th place play-off

World Cup Final

Statistics

Teams

Individual records

Top point scorers

Top try scorers

References

External links 
 2006 WRWC Homepage
 WRWC 2006
 247.tv – Live video and replays of all the Women's Rugby World Cup matches

 
2006
2006 in Canadian rugby union
2006 rugby union tournaments for national teams
International women's rugby union competitions hosted by Canada
2006 in women's rugby union
Sport in Edmonton
August 2006 sports events in Canada
September 2006 sports events in Canada